Pipeline is a 2017 play written by Dominique Morisseau. It originally opened off-Broadway on July 10, 2017, and closed on August 27, 2017.

Productions
The show premiered on Off-Broadway at the Mitzi E. Newhouse Theater on July 10, 2017, directed by Lileana Blain-Cruz, set design Matt Saunders, costume design Montana Levi Bianco, lighting design Yi Zhao, sound design Justin Ellington, and production design by Hannah Wasileski. The cast included Karen Pittman (Nya), Namir Smallwood (Omari), Heather Velazquez (Jasmine), Morocco Omari (Xavier), Tasha Lawrence (Laurie), and Jamie Lincoln Smith (Dun).

Reviews
Ben Brantley of The New York Times said the play was "passionate but frustratingly unresolved play about a family struggling to outrun social prophecy." Frank Scheck of The Hollywood Reporter said "While there are some powerful moments, Pipeline overall fails to come to life." Marilyn Stasio of the Variety stated the play was "emotionally harrowing, ethically ambiguous drama that raises barbed questions about class, race, parental duty, and the state of American education."

Awards and nominations

References

External links
 

2017 plays
African-American plays
Off-Broadway plays
Plays about race and ethnicity